The paleontological sites of Lebanon contain deposits of well preserved fossils and include some species found nowhere else. Notable among these is the Lebanese lagerstätten of the Late Cretaceous age, which contain a well-preserved variety of different fossils. Some fossils date back to the Jurassic period, and younger fossils of mammals from a different site belong to the Miocene through the Pleistocene.

History
The earliest known account of Lebanese fossils is attributed to Herodotus. The existence of fossil fishes in the Lebanon is referred to by Jean de Joinville. In his Histoire de Saint Louis he wrote that during the sojourn of King Louis IX of France at Sidon in 1253, just before his return home from the Seventh Crusade, a stone was brought him,

European scientists became interested in Lebanese fossils in the 19th century.

Locations and fossils

There are three major fossil locations in Lebanon: Sahel Alma, Hajula and Hakel. Hajula and Hakel are each about twelve miles north-east of the coastal town of Byblos. Hajula is situated six miles south of Hakel; and between the two villages there are two westward-projecting spurs of Mount Lebanon and an intervening valley. Both villages are approximately 2500–3000 feet above sea level. In both places there is clear evidence of faulting by which the fish-bearing strata have been lowered into the midst of older strata. Those at Hakel have been lowered to the level of the hippurite limestone of Lebanon, being above the trigonia sandstone. The Hajula beds are thought to be an extension of those at Hakel. The study of fish fossils appears to show that the horizon of the beds at Hajula is somewhat higher than that of the beds at Hakel.

The fishes found at Sahel Alma mostly belong to the same genera as those at Hakel and Hajula, but of around sixty species, probably not one is found elsewhere. Twenty-one species found at Hajula also occur at Hakel. These data make it quite certain that the beds at Sahel Alma are on a different level from those at Hakel and Hajula; while those at the latter places are on the same, or nearly the same, horizon. Opinions differ as to which are older, the fish-beds at Sahel Alma or those at Hakel, but the view of modern authorities is that those at Hakel are more ancient. This opinion appears to be supported by the character of the fishes in each. From a study of the fishes taken at Hajula, the beds containing them may belong to a slightly more recent time than that of the beds at Hakel.

The landscape of Lebanon has been subject to volcanic eruptions, tectonic plate movement, and the rising and dropping of sea levels. The Late Cretaceous was characterized by very high sea levels. During that time fossil-bearing limestone was formed.

One of the discoveries reported in 1989 was the description of Hipparion fossils from the Bekaa Valley by M. Malez and A. Forsten.

Another find was a snake with two legs. This provided a valuable example of evolution at work, illustrating how ancient lizards became modern snakes. 

Octopuses are some of the rarest marine fossils, since most species have no hard structures apart from a beak. An octopus's corpse cannot usually survive long enough to become fossilized, which is why the discovery of well-preserved octopuses in Lebanon in 2009 was remarkable. Dirk Fuchs of the Freie University Berlin said about these 95-million-year-old fossil octopuses found in Lebanon: 

Some of the fossils of Keuppia levante are preserved so well that their ink is still visible.

Fossil taxa discovered in Lebanon

See also
Byblos Fossil Museum
Dany Azar on Wikispecies
Mim Museum

References

External links

Expo Hakel, a fossil museum in Hakel

 
Paleontological sites of Asia
Archaeological sites in Lebanon